Lanza Longa sometimes also known in Italian as gialda.; modernly known scholarly mostly as lanzalonga, the term was also, normally, translated in Tudor period english as Long Spear.

It was a medieval pole weapon typical of Italian municipal infantry, a type of spear between 3 and 4.5 meters long

Known as "lanza longa" (long lance) precisely for the minimum length of its rod of at least 3 meters, it served to counter the charges of the enemy cavalry by forming in front of it the forehead of a forest of spikes. The blade was generally leafy - but varied in length, thickness, width - and the rod was round in section. It evolves or is replaced by the even longer pike.

In detail the lanzalonga was specifically an infantry weapon, a spear, typical of northern Italy; the shorter version known as the gialda was more commonly in use in central Italy, particularly in Tuscany, and was, technically, a long lance used by both infantry and cavalry. The later Lanza Longa as was more commonly known in the British islands was a shorter version used for training and in duels and its use was taught by most of the more famous manuals of the period.

Notes

Further reading 
Aldo A. Settia: De re militari. Pratica e teoria nella guerra medievale; Collana: I libri di Viella, 83; Novembre 2008.
Fiore dei Liberi; Tommaso Leoni: Fiore de' Liberi's Fior di Battaglia, a full translation of the Getty manuscript. 1st ed. Lulu.com (2009). 2nd ed. Wheaton, IL: Freelance Academy Press (2012).

External links 
 Ottawa Medieval Sword Guild: The Spear, the King of Weapons. A Practical  Analysis of the Spear in Fiore dei Liberi’s Flos Dellatorum and Fillipo Vadi’s Ars Gladiatoria
Italian Encyclopaedia of Science, Letters, and Arts - Treccani: Enciclopedia dell'Arte Medievale (1991): ARMI BIANCHE

Medieval weapons